Black Icefalls is a line of icefalls at the south margin of Chapman Snowfield, Churchill Mountains. The icefalls extend southwest from Mount Massam to Vance Bluff, and were named in honor of A. W. Black, a member of the 1959 Cape Hallett winter-over team, working as a technician on the geomagnetic project.

References
 

Icefalls of Oates Land